Reports on Mathematical Physics is a peer-reviewed scientific journal, started in 1970, which publishes papers in theoretical physics that present a rigorous mathematical approach to problems of quantum and classical mechanics, field theories, relativity and gravitation, statistical physics, and the mathematical foundations of physical theories. The editor-in-chief of this journal is Andrzej Jamiołkowski. The impact factor of this journal is 0.742 in 2020. The CiteScore of the journal is 1.6 in 2020.

References

External links
 The journal's homepage at Elsevier

Mathematics journals
Publications established in 1970
Elsevier academic journals
Physics journals